The red-breasted paradise kingfisher or fairy paradise kingfisher (Tanysiptera nympha) is a species of bird in the family Alcedinidae.
It is found in New Guinea.
Its natural habitats are subtropical or tropical moist lowland forest and subtropical or tropical mangrove forest.

References

red-breasted paradise kingfisher
Birds of New Guinea
red-breasted paradise kingfisher
red-breasted paradise kingfisher
Taxonomy articles created by Polbot